Radiant Logic, Inc. is a US-based computer software corporation focusing on solutions for identity data unification and integration, creating an Identity Data Fabric to improve business operations spanning enterprise information integration, information security, and data management. The company pioneered the development of the virtual directory (VDS) in complex enterprise Identity Management deployments, which they then evolved into a more comprehensive and scalable federated identity and directory service, and later the premier Identity Data Fabric. 

Products/Platform: 

Radiant Logic's product suite is called the RadiantOne Intelligent Identity Data Platform. The platform contains several modules, and is primarily powered by the RadiantOne Federated Identity Engine ("FID") which is designed specifically for deployment in high-volume, high-complexity identity environments. RadiantOne FID includes an abstraction layer, extracting and virtualizing identity and context information out of various application and data silos, including AD domains and forests, LDAP directories, SQL databases, and more. The RadiantOne Platform also includes Universal Directory, which is fully LDAP v3 compatible. RadiantOne FID re-maps the underlying data sources and presents the identity data in views customized for the needs of enterprise applications to enable authentication and fine-grained authorization for identity management and context-driven applications.
 

Customer Base:

Radiant Logic's global customer base includes many Fortune 1000 companies in the fields of banking, finance, insurance, government, communications, manufacturing, education, entertainment and healthcare. 

Location: 

Headquartered in Novato, CA, Radiant Logic has satellite offices in Chicago and Washington, DC, the United Kingdom, and distribution channels throughout the world.

References

Companies based in Marin County, California
Business software companies
Novato, California
Software companies based in the San Francisco Bay Area
Software companies established in 1995
Software companies of the United States
Singaporean companies established in 1995